Hrebinka Raion (translit.: Hrebinkivs'kyi Raion) was a raion (district) in Poltava Oblast in central Ukraine. The raion's administrative center was the city of Hrebinka. The raion was abolished and its territory was merged into Lubny Raion on 18 July 2020 as part of the administrative reform of Ukraine, which reduced the number of raions of Poltava Oblast to four. The last estimate of the raion population was 

Important rivers within the Hrebinkivskyi Raion included the Sliporod and the Orzhytsya. The raion was officially founded on February 25, 1935, updated on December 8, 1966.

Settlements

References

Former raions of Poltava Oblast
1935 establishments in Ukraine
Ukrainian raions abolished during the 2020 administrative reform